The Navarre Beach Sea Turtle Conservation Center is a sea turtle study and rehabilitation center located in Navarre, Florida. Specifically, it is located within the Navarre Beach Marine Park. 

The facility opened in 2013, using the building of an old ranger station that had been used by the state park service when the marine park was still a state park. The building was renovated and rebuilt to include a 15,000 gallon aquarium and sea turtle medical and rehabilitation equipment. 

The center is a member of the global non-profit Species360 that seeks to better share information pertinent to the saving of endangered species, such as sea turtles. The center commonly assist federal, state, and local authorities in investigating environmental violations, infractions, and breakages of law.

The center is popular among eco-tourists visiting the area and is commonly cited as one of the best attractions in Navarre. The center sees 15,000 visitors annually.

References

Navarre, Florida
Conservation in Navarre, Florida

Tourist attractions in Santa Rosa County, Florida